The Jewish Center of Atlantic Beach (JCAB) is an Orthodox Synagogue located on Nassau Avenue in Atlantic Beach, New York. The Synagogue was founded in 1953. JCAB is the only Synagogue in Atlantic Beach. The Congregations includes approximately 250 families.

Rabbi Samuel Klibanoff served as the Rabbi of the Congregation for 11 years (2004–2015). After Rabbi Klibanoff left, Rabbi Ari Perl Served as rabbi for 3 years. Currently, the congregation has a temporary Rabbi, Rabbi Prus. During the summer months, Rabbi Simcha Willig, son of Rabbi Mordechai Willig, serves as a rabbi.

Prominent members 
The Congregation is known for members who are prominent businessmen and philanthropists, including Billionaires Max Stern, Leonard N. Stern, Henry Sweica, and Ira Rennert, and businessman J. Ezra Merkin.

References

External links
 

Orthodox synagogues in New York (state)
Synagogues in Nassau County, New York
1953 establishments in New York (state)